"Reloj" is a song recorded by Puerto Rican singer Rauw Alejandro and Puerto Rican rapper Anuel AA for Alejandro's debut studio album, Afrodisíaco (2020). It was written by Alejandro, Yampi, Luis Guillermo Marval Camerom, Nesty, Anuel AA, Caleb Calloway, Kenobi, Colla, and Eric Duars, while the production was handled by Calloway and Nesty. The song was released for digital download and streaming by Sony Music Latin and Duars Entertainment on October 22, 2020, as the fourth single from the album. A Spanish language melodic reggaeton song with urban rhythms, it is about the sexual desire the singers feel towards a girl, describing everything they would do to her if the clock had more hours.

"Reloj" received positive reviews from music critics, who complimented its rhythms. The track was nominated for Viral Anthem at the 2021 MTV Millennial Awards. It was commercially successful, reaching the top 10 in several Latin American countries, including Colombia and Mexico, and on Billboards Hot Latin Songs in the United States. The song has received several certifications, including double platinum in Spain. An accompanying music video, released simultaneously with the song, was directed by Gustavo Camacho. It depicts Alejandro and Anuel AA enjoying a party atmosphere and singing the track in a strip club.

Background and release
Rauw Alejandro announced that he was working on his debut studio album Afrodisíaco in February 2020. After releasing several singles from the album, he announced the release of a collaboration with Anuel AA and revealed the song's title as "Reloj" on Twitter on October 21, 2020: "🦊 x 👹 #Reloj tomorrow at 8PM ..." Alejandro later explained to Idolator that he and Anuel AA were classmates in school and "childhood friends". He added: "The vibe at the studio was amazing, very easy to work with." On October 22, 2020, "Reloj" was released for digital download and streaming by Sony Music Latin and Duars Entertainment as the fourth single from Afrodisíaco. It marked the third collaboration between Alejandro and Anuel AA, who had previously worked on "Elegí (Remix)" and "Fantasías (Remix)".

Music and lyrics

Musically, "Reloj" is a Spanish language melodic reggaeton song with urban rhythms, that "fuses the styles" of both artists to "present a totally different proposal". The song was written by Alejandro, Yampi, Luis Guillermo Marval Camerom, Nesty, Anuel AA, Caleb Calloway, Kenobi, Colla, and Eric Duars. Its production was handled by Calloway and Nesty, and the track runs for a total of 3 minutes and 51 seconds. Lyrically, "Reloj" which translates to "Clock" in English, is about the sexual desire they feel towards a girl, describing everything they would do to her if the clock had more hours. The "sensual" lyrics include, "No hizo nada mal, pero quiere que la castigue / Gime como una muñequita de anime (Wah) / Como una serie pegá', viéndo me sigue (Wuh) / Y yo loco con verla mordiendo los cojine'" (She did nothing wrong, but she wants me to punish her / Moans like an anime doll (Wah) / Like a hit series, watches and follows me (Wuh) / And I'm crazy to see her biting the cushions).

Critical reception
Laura Coca from Los 40 gave "Reloj" a positive review and labeled it "a song with the most mesmerizing urban rhythms", stating that Alejandro "never tires of throwing hits". In another article, she described the track as "a song of pure reggaeton rhythms to become the new vice of their millions of followers." In 2022, Fuse ranked it as Alejandro's third-top song. In the same year, Ernesto Lechner from Rolling Stone ranked the track as his 45th-best song.

Accolades
"Reloj" was nominated for Viral Anthem at the 2021 MTV Millennial Awards, but lost to "Pareja del Año" by Sebastián Yatra and Myke Towers.

Commercial performance
"Reloj" debuted at number 26 on the US Billboard Hot Latin Songs chart on November 7, 2020, becoming Alejandro's 10th entry and Anuel AA's 65th. On May 1, 2021, the track reached its peak of number 10, giving Alejandro his fourth top-10 hit on the chart and Anuel AA's 22nd. The song also peaked at numbers 18, 11, and 8 on the Latin Airplay, Latin Rhythm Airplay, and Latin Digital Song Sales charts, respectively. In Spain's official weekly chart, the track debuted and peaked at number 11 on November 1, 2020. It was later certified double platinum by the Productores de Música de España (PROMUSICAE), for track-equivalent sales of over 80,000 units in the country. "Reloj" also reached the top 10 in Colombia, Dominican Republic, El Salvador, Guatemala, Honduras, Mexico, and Peru, as well as the top 20 in Argentina, Bolivia, Ecuador, Latin America, Paraguay, Puerto Rico, and Uruguay. In Mexico, the song was certified diamond + 3× platinum + gold by the Asociación Mexicana de Productores de Fonogramas y Videogramas (AMPROFON), for track-equivalent sales of over 510,000 units.

Promotion

Music video

An accompanying music video was released simultaneously with the song. The visual was directed by Gustavo "Gus" Camacho, who had previously directed the video for Alejandro's singles "Fantasías" and "Tattoo (Remix)". It depicts Alejandro and Anuel AA enjoying a party atmosphere and singing the track in a strip club, while multiple women in undergarment are dancing to the rhythm of it. In another scene, Alejandro and Anuel AA are shown singing the song in a dressing room.

Live performances
The song was included on the set list for Alejandro's the Vice Versa Tour.

Track listing

Credits and personnel
Credits adapted from Tidal.

 Rauw Alejandro associated performer, composer, lyricist
 Anuel AA associated performer, composer, lyricist
 Jean Pierre Soto "Yampi" composer, lyricist
 Luis Guillermo Marval Camero composer, lyricist
 Ernesto Padilla "Nesty" composer, lyricist, producer
 Héctor C. López "Caleb Calloway" composer, lyricist, producer
 Jorge E. Pizarro "Kenobi" composer, lyricist, recording engineer
 José M. Collazo "Colla" composer, lyricist, mastering engineer, mixing engineer
 Eric Pérez Rovira "Eric Duars" composer, lyricist, executive producer
 Amber Rubi Urena A&R coordinator
 John Eddie Pérez A&R director

Charts

Weekly charts

Monthly charts

Year-end charts

Certifications

Release history

Footnotes

References

2020 songs
2020 singles
Rauw Alejandro songs
Anuel AA songs
Songs written by Rauw Alejandro
Songs written by Anuel AA
Sony Music Latin singles
Spanish-language songs